Madoc or Madog was a legendary Welsh prince who allegedly discovered America in 1170.

Madoc may also refer to:

People

People in Welsh history
Madog Elfed (c. 600), a hero mentioned in the medieval Welsh poem Y Gododdin
Madog ap Rhiryd (12th-century), prince of part of Powys
Madog ap Maredudd (died 1160), the last prince of a united Kingdom of Powys
Princes of Powys Fadog in north-east Wales:
Madog ap Gruffydd Maelor, son of Madog ap Maredudd, prince 1191–1236
Madog II ap Gruffydd, Lord of Dinas Bran, son of Gruffydd II ap Madog, prince 1269–1277
Madog Crypl, grandson of Madog II ap Gruffydd, prince 1289–1304, sometimes known as Madog III
Madog Fychan, probably son of Madog Crypl, prince 1304–c.1325
Madog ap Llywelyn (13th-century), prince of the Kingdom of Gwynedd
Madoc ap Uthyr, a legendary figure, son of Uther Pendragon and brother of King Arthur

Other people
 Philip Madoc (1934–2012), Welsh actor
 Ruth Madoc (1943–2022), British actress and singer

Places
 Madoc, Ontario (township), a township in Canada
 Madoc, Ontario (village), a nearby village
 Madog River, in Guam
 Maen Madoc, a menhir (standing stone) in the Brecon Beacons, South Wales

Other uses 
 Madoc (poem), an 1805 poem by Robert Southey
 Madoc (Tijdschrift over de middeleeuwen), a Dutch journal of medieval studies

See also
 Maedoc, the equivalent Irish name
 Maddock (disambiguation)
 Mad Dog (disambiguation)
 Prince Madoc (disambiguation)
 
 

Welsh masculine given names